Deerfield Township is one of twelve townships in Chickasaw County, Iowa, USA.  As of the 2000 census, its population was 417.

History
Deerfield Township was organized in 1856.

Geography
According to the USGS, it contains one cemetery, Deerfield.

The stream of Elk Creek runs through this township.

References

 USGS Geographic Names Information System (GNIS)

External links
 US-Counties.com
 City-Data.com

Townships in Chickasaw County, Iowa
Townships in Iowa